Rajasthani literature written in various genres starting from 1000 AD. But, it is generally agreed that modern Rajasthani literature began with the works of Suryamal Misran. His most important works are the Vansa Bhaskara and the Vir Satsai. The Vans Bhaskar contains accounts of the Rajput princes who ruled in what was then Rajputana (at present the state of Rajasthan), during the lifetime of the poet (1872–1952). The Vir Satsai is a collection of hundreds of couplets.

Medieval Rajasthani literature is mostly poetry only and it is more about the heroic poetry mentioning of the great kings and fighters of the Rajasthan. as said by Rabindra Nath Tagore once, "The heroic  sentiment which is the essence of every song and couplet of a Rajasthani is peculiar emotion of its own of which, however, the whole country may be proud".

Early Rajasthani literature is created by mostly Charans. Earlier Rajasthani was known as Charani or Dingal, which was close to Gujarati.

See also
Khyat
Dhola Maru
Prithviraj Raso
Bhavai
Braj literature
Rajasthani people
List of winners of Sahitya Akademi Awards for writing in Rajasthani language
List of Rajasthani poets

Bibliography
Primary Sources
Padmanābha; Bhatnagar, V. S. (1991). Kanhadade Prabandha: India's greatest patriotic saga of medieval times : Padmanābha's epic account of Kānhaḍade. New Delhi: Voice of India.

References

 Narrative Traditions of Rajasthan. International Institute for Asian Studies.
 Rajasthani language. indiansaga.com.

External links
Centre for Rajasthani Studies. Bastigiri.org.
Rajasthani. Ethnologue.
Jain Poets in Rajasthani. Technology Development for Indian Languages. Ministry of Information Technology.

 
Indian literature by language
Rajasthani language
Rajasthani culture